Pauline Yeung Bo-ling (楊寶玲, born April 17, 1967) is a Hong Kong actress and a former Miss Hong Kong Pageant 1987. She was born in Hong Kong with ancestry in Dongguan, Guangdong, China.

Yeung won the 1987 Miss Hong Kong Pageant, and went on to compete at the 1987 Miss World pageant, where she placed amongst the top 12 semi-finalists and went on to win the Continental Queen of Asia award. She later participated in the 1988 Miss Universe pageant. She entered the semi-finals in 6th place, and went on to place fourth runner-up to the eventual winner, Porntip Nakhirunkanok of Thailand. To date, Yeung is the only representative from Hong Kong to place both at Miss World and Miss Universe. She is the last representative from Hong Kong to place at Miss Universe until the region stopped sending its winners to Miss Universe after 2000.

Filmography

External links
 
 HK cinemagic entry

1967 births
20th-century Hong Kong actresses
Hong Kong film actresses
Hong Kong television actresses
Living people
Miss Universe 1988 contestants
Miss World 1987 delegates